HMS Alarm was a  of the British Royal Navy. She was built by John Brown and Company at their Clydebank shipyard, being built between 1910 and 1911, completing in March 1911. Armament consisted of two 4-inch (102 mm) guns, two 12-pounder (3-inch, 76 mm) guns and two 21-inch (533 mm) torpedo tubes.

Alarm served through the First World War, both in the North Sea as part of the Grand Fleet and later in the Mediterranean Sea. She was sold for scrap in 1921.

Construction and design
The British Admiralty ordered 20  destroyers as part of the 1909–1910 shipbuilding programme for the Royal Navy. Alarm was laid down on 7 February 1910 and launched on 28 August 1910. Alarm reached a speed of  during sea trials and was completed in March 1911.

Displacement was  normal and  full load. The ship's machinery consisted of four Yarrow boilers feeding steam to Parsons steam turbines which drove three propeller shafts. The ship had a crew of 72 officers and enlisted.

Gun armament consisted of two  BL Mk VIII guns, one on the ship's forecastle and one aft, and two 12-pounder (76 mm) QF 12 cwt guns carried in the waist position between the first two funnels. Torpedo armament consisted of two  torpedo tubes, with two reload torpedoes carried. The torpedo tubes were aft of the funnels, mounted singly with a searchlight position between them. By 1918, a 3-pounder (47 mm) anti aircraft gun was fitted, and depth charges were carried.

Service
On commissioning, Alarm joined the 2nd Destroyer Flotilla of the Royal Navy's Home Fleet, and was joined by her sister ships as they commissioned.  She was one of seven destroyers that suffered problems when steaming at full speed off the coast of Ireland during the 1911 Naval Manoeuvres, with serious leaks of water through hull rivets into the ships' oil tanks, requiring that they put into Portland Harbour for repairs. On 26 January 1912, Alarm was one of seven destroyers and one torpedo boat that was ordered to be fitted with anti-submarine sweeps. These were explosive charges that were carried on cables that were towed behind the ship. When the cable caught on a submerged submarine, the explosive charge would be drawn down the cable onto the submarine. Alarm was still part of the 2nd Flotilla in August 1914, on the eve of the outbreak of the First World War.

On the outbreak of the First World War, the 2nd Destroyer Flotilla, including Alarm joined the newly established Grand Fleet at Scapa Flow. On 16 October 1914, four destroyers of the 2nd Flotilla,  and Alarm were patrolling at the eastern end of the Pentland Firth between the Orkneys and mainland Scotland. At about 1:15 pm that day, Nymphe spotted a periscope. It was the German submarine , which had sunk the British cruiser  the previous day. U-9 launched a torpedo which narrowly missed both Nymphe and Alarm, and while Nymphe attempted to ram the submarine, U-9 escaped.

The 2nd Flotilla remained at Scapa Flow until March 1916, but by April the flotilla, including Alarm, had moved to Devonport naval base in Plymouth. On 13 November 1916, Alarm was ordered to rendezvous with the transport Idaho, bound for Portland from New York with a load of explosives, but fog delayed Alarms departure from Devonport, so that Idaho was unescorted when the German submarine  attacked. Idahos crew abandoned ship, but the destroyer  had heard Idahos SOS radio signals, and arrived in time to drive off U-49 and save Idaho. On 22 March 1917, Alarm and Tigress were employed in escorting the battleship . On 24 March 1917, Alarm picked up 11 survivors from the merchant ship , sunk the previous day by the submarine  when bound for Newhaven from Saint-Valery-sur-Somme.

In July 1917, the 2nd Flotilla, including Alarm, moved to Buncrana in the north of Ireland. By December 1917, Alarm had moved to the Mediterranean Fleet, joining the 5th Destroyer Flotilla.

On the night of 22/23 April 1918, Alarm was one of six destroyers patrolling in the Otranto Straits to protect the drifters of the Otranto Barrage from attack by Austro-Hungarian naval forces. At about 21:10hr, five unknown ships were spotted by Hornet, which challenged them. Both Hornet and Jackal were damaged in the exchange of fire, but the Austro-Hungarian ships abandoned their raid as the alarm had been raised. Alarm, Cimeterre, Comet and Torrens responded to the gunfire, and joining up with Jackal chased after the Austro-Hungarian ships, but broke off the pursuit as they approached the enemy coast, owing to the risk from mines. Alarm was still a member of the 5th Destroyer Flotilla at the end of the war on 11 November 1918.

Disposal
Following the end of the war, pre-war destroyers like the Acorns were quickly laid up into reserve. Alarm was laid up at Portsmouth by March 1919. She was sold on 9 May 1921 to Ward for scrapping at their Hayle, Cornwall yard.

Pennant Numbers

References

 
 
 
 
 
 
 
 
 
 
 

 

Acorn-class destroyers
World War I destroyers of the United Kingdom
1910 ships